Georges Marie Frederic Margot (30 May 1902 – 5 October 1998) was a French equestrian. He competed in two events at the 1936 Summer Olympics.

References

External links
 

1902 births
1998 deaths
French male equestrians
Olympic equestrians of France
Equestrians at the 1936 Summer Olympics
Sportspeople from Versailles, Yvelines